Dana Meadows are meadows located in the north-end of Kaghan Valley in Mansehra District of Khyber Pakhtunkhwa the province of Pakistan. Dana Meadows are located at

Khanian is the starting point for a trip to Dana Meadows. The track to Dana Meadows was destroyed by the 2005 Kashmir earthquake.

See also 
Khanian
Shogran
Kaghan Valley

References 

Meadows in Pakistan
Tourist attractions in Khyber Pakhtunkhwa